Grliče is a settlement in the Municipality of Šmarje pri Jelšah in eastern Slovenia. The area of the municipality was traditionally part of Styria and is now included in the Savinja Statistical Region.

References

External links
Grliče at Geopedia

Populated places in the Municipality of Šmarje pri Jelšah